The Association of California Symphony Orchestras (ACSO) is a non-profit trade association based in Los Angeles. It was founded in 1969 by a small group of orchestra managers, and currently serves over 150 organizations and their 2,000 board and staff members. ACSO's members are professional, academic, youth, and community-based orchestras, choruses, and festivals in California and the western region. The members of its board of directors are leaders from the classical music community throughout the state of California and western region. ACSO's headquarters are in Los Angeles with additional staff in Sacramento. ACSO's first executive director was Kris Sinclair, who retired after 31 years. Mitch Menchaca succeeded Sinclair in 2016, and Sarah Weber is the current executive director.

ACSO's member orchestras and choruses include American Youth Symphony, Andromeda Electric Orchestra, Auburn Symphony, Baroque Music Festival Corona del Mar, Bay Area Rainbow Symphony, Bear Valley Music Festival, Berkeley Symphony Orchestra, Burbank Philharmonic Orchestra, California Chamber Orchestra, California Symphony, California Youth Symphony, Camellia Symphony, Carmel Bach Festival, Cason City Symphony, Castro Valley Orchestra Association, Chamber Music Palisades, Chamber Orchestra of the South Bay, Claremont Concert Orchestra, Claremont Symphony Orchestra, Civic Youth Orchestra, Colburn School, Community Women's Orchestra, Corona Symphony Orchestra, Culver City Symphony Orchestra, Diablo Symphony, Downey Symphony Orchestra, Eureka Symphony, Festival Mozaic, Folsom Lake Symphony, Fremont Symphony Orchestra, Fresno Philharmonic, Golden State Youth Orchestra, Hall-Musco Conservatory of Music, Hutchins Consort, Inner City Youth Orchestra of Los Angeles, Kensington Symphony Orchestra, La Jolla Symphony & Chorus, Las Vegas Philharmonic, Livermore-Amador Symphony, Long Beach Symphony, Los Angeles Chamber Orchestra, Los Angeles Children's Chorus, Los Angeles Doctors Symphony Orchestra, Los Angeles Philharmonic, Los Angeles Philharmonic Affiliates, Marin Symphony, Master Sinfonia Chamber Orchestra, Mendocino Music Festival, Merced Symphony Association, Midsummer Mozart Festival, Mill Valley Philharmonic, Mission Chamber Orchestra of San Jose, Modesto Symphony Orchestra, Monterey Symphony, Music Academy of the West, Music in the Mountains, Music in the Vineyards, Napa Valley Youth Symphony Orchestra, New Century Chamber Orchestra, New West Symphony, North State Symphony, Nova Vista Symphony, Oakland East Bay Symphony, Oakland Symphony, Ojai Music Festival, Orchestra in the Schools, Orchestra Santa Monica, Pacific Chorale, Pacific Symphony, Peninsula Symphony, Pacific Youth Symphony - University of the Pacific, Paradise Symphony Orchestra, Pasadena Symphony and POPS, Peninsula Symphony (NorCal), Peninsula Symphony (SoCal), Peninsula Youth Orchestra, Philharmonia Baroque Orchestra, Prelude Strings, Pittance Chamber Music, Redlands Symphony, Redwood Symphony, Reno Philharmonic, Reno Chamber Orchestra, Riverside Philharmonic, Sacramento Master Singers, Sacramento Philharmonic Orchestra, Sacramento Youth Symphony, San Bernardino Symphony Orchestra, San Diego Symphony, San Diego Youth Symphony & Conservatory, San Francisco Conservatory of Music, San Francisco Philharmonic, San Francisco Symphony, San Jose Chamber Orchestra, San Jose Youth Symphony, San Luis Obispo Symphony, Santa Barbara Symphony Orchestra, Santa Cruz Symphony, Santa Maria Philharmonic Society, Santa Monica Symphony, Santa Rosa Symphony, Sequoia Symphony Orchestra, Southeast Symphony, Southern California Philharmonic, South Coast Symphony, Stanford University Orchestras, Stockton Symphony, Symphony of the Redwoods, Symphony San Jose, Temecula Valley Symphony & Youth Symphony, Thousand Oaks Philharmonic, Tucson Symphony Orchestra, Vallejo Symphony, Whittier Regional Symphony, Westmont College Orchestra, Women's Philharmonic Advocacy, Young People's Symphony Orchestra, Youth Music Monterey County, and Youth Orchestras of Fresno. Additional member organizations include American Society of Composers, Authors and Publishers (ASCAP),  Arts Management Systems Ltd., BMI, Colbert Artists Management, Dream Warrior Group, Music Celebrations International, Opus 3 Artists, Robert Swaney Consulting, Inc., and Young Concert Artists.

Programs & Services 
ACSO offers a variety of programs and services for its members and the field. These professional and organizational development opportunities address orchestra management, board/governance, and artistic issues.

Awards 
The ACSO Awards program recognizes remarkable individuals and organizations for their meaningful contributions to the orchestra field. ACSO oversees four awards in its portfolio:

 Executive Leadership Award & Emerging Professional Award
 Launched in 2020, the Executive Leadership Award and the Emerging Professional Award are competitive awards that recognize individuals who represent two ends of the administrative spectrum – those who have demonstrated ability and impact early in their careers, and those who have been advancing in leadership roles for many years and whose calculated risks, acumen for strategy, and program-building have propelled their organizations to success.
 MVP Volunteer Award
 Initiated in 1996, the Most Valuable Player (MVP) Volunteer Awards were created to recognize exemplary volunteers, volunteer projects, and volunteer organizations working for California's symphony orchestras. The MVP Volunteer Award is not a competition, but an opportunity for your extraordinary volunteer(s) to be recognized publicly. An administrative staff leader of an ACSO member organization may submit one completed nomination form, which constitutes the sole basis of the award being given. Nominations may be made for an individual volunteer, a volunteer committee, or a volunteer organization (such as a league or guild).

California Concerts and Events Calendar 
ACSO hosts a calendar of orchestra performances and events around the state and region. The information represents concerts presented by current member organizations

Career Center 
ACSO's career center allows organizational and business members to post jobs at no cost and reaches the region's finest administrators, music directors, and other classical music professionals

Online Learning 
ACSO's online learning program includes distance education, virtual professional development, and virtual networking opportunities for members that are not always able to travel to conference or in-person programs.

 Virtual Peer Forums
 Virtual Peer Forums (VPFs) are peer-to-peer conversations led by a facilitator and designed to connect you with your counterparts at other orchestras and ensembles in the ACSO membership network. This is a space to discuss working during times of transition, to exchange ideas, to ask questions, to share challenges, and to offer practices that have worked well (or not) for you and your organization. Most importantly, it is an opportunity to strengthen your professional networks and find colleagues to rely on for support.
 Ask an Expert Webinars
 Webinars are 60-to-90-minute online workshops covering an array of topics from fundraising to marketing to board development.

Governance

Board Officers 
Officers for 2021-2022 are:

 Alice Sauro, President
 Steve Friedlander, Treasurer
 Loribeth Gregory-Beck, Secretary
 Scott Vandrick, Vice President

Board Members 
Members for 2021-2022 are:

 Jessica Bajarano
 Nora Brady
 Chelsea Chambers
 Amanda Wu Chroust
 Jeri Crawford
 Alicia Gonzalez
 Mieko Hatano
 Jamei Hawell
 Kathryn R. Martin
 Dean McVay
 Akilah Morgan
 Nicola Reilly
 Jonathan Rios
 Elizabeth Shribman
 Amber Joy Weber
 Donna M. Williams
 John Wineglass

References

External links 

Official Website

Music organizations based in the United States
Musical groups established in 1969
Orchestras based in California